The 2008–09 Rochdale A.F.C. season was the club's 88th season in the Football League, and the 35th consecutive season in the bottom division of the League. Rochdale finished the season in 6th place in League Two, but missed out on promotion to League One after losing in the play-off semi-final against Gillingham. Adam Le Fondre finished as the club's top goal scorer with twenty goals in all competitions.

League table

Players

Squad information

Statistics
																												
																												

|}

Transfers

In

Loans In

Competitions

Friendlies

League Two

League Two play-offs

FA Cup

League Cup

League Trophy

References

Rochdale A.F.C. seasons
Rochdale